Enright is a family name, possibly derived from the Irish "Innreachtaigh", "Irraghty", or "indrecht".

People whose family name is or was Enright include:

Andrew Coulter Enright, American artist
Anne Enright, Irish novelist
Barbara Enright, professional poker player
Barry Enright, professional baseball starting pitcher for the Arizona Diamondbacks
Brock Enright, American artist
Charlie Enright, American sailor
Corey Enright, Australian Rules footballer playing for the Geelong Football Club
Dan Enright, American television producer
Derek Enright, British Labour Party politician
D. J. Enright, British academic, poet, novelist and critic
Dick Enright, American football player and coach
Dom Enright, Irish hurler
Eddie Enright, Irish hurler
Edmund Enright, Irish singer-songwriter better known as Mundy
Elizabeth Enright, American children's author and illustrator
George Enright, American baseball player
Gerry Enright, Irish Gaelic football player
Harold Enright, American track and field athlete
Jack Enright, American baseball player
James Enright, American professional basketball referee
James Enright, Canadian Paralympic athlete
Jim Enright, American pornographic film director
Jim T. Enright, professor of behavioral physiology at the Scripps Institution of Oceanography
Jo Enright, British comedian and comic actress
Joe Enright, Irish footballer
John Enright, United States Navy sailor, a recipient of the Medal of Honor
Joseph F. Enright, submarine captain in the United States Navy
Leo J. Enright, Irish broadcaster and veteran space commentator
Leonard Enright, Irish hurler
Olwyn Enright, Irish Fine Gael politician
Maginel Wright Enright, American children's book illustrator and graphic artist
Marlene Enright, Irish singer
Mary Enright, New Zealand teacher, journalist and community worker
Maurice Enright, Irish-American gangster
Meagan Enright, Enright Design founder, architectural technologist
Michael Enright (disambiguation)
Michael Enright, British actor and volunteer for Kurdish forces
Michael Enright, Canadian radio broadcaster
Michael Enright, Irish Democratic Left politician
Nick Enright, Australian dramatist and playwright
Paddy Enright, Irish hurler
Peter Enright, Australian cricket Test match umpire
Philip King Enright, British admiral of the Royal Navy
Ray Enright, American film director
Ray Enright (Canadian football), Canadian football player
Rex Enright, American football and basketball player, coach, and college athletics administrator
Robert Enright, Canadian journalist
Richard Enright, NYPD Police Commissioner from 1918 until 1925
Shane Enright, Irish Gaelic football player
Stephanie Enright, Puerto Rican volleyball player
Thomas Enright, American serviceman of World War I
Thomas Jones Enright, American mathematician
Tom Enright, Irish Fine Gael politician
Walter John Enright, Australian solicitor and amateur anthropologist
William Benner Enright, Senior United States District Judge of the United States District Court for the Southern District of California

References 

 
 

Surnames of Irish origin